Natasha Gale (born 13 May 1988 in Leeds) is a British amateur boxer who is affiliated with the Jubilee club.

On her senior championship debut in 2016, she became the second British woman (after double Olympic champion Nicola Adams) to win a European boxing title.

References

1988 births
Living people
English women boxers
Sportspeople from Leeds
Middleweight boxers